Sadashiva Brahmavar (1928–2018), known as Brahmavar, was an Indian actor who appeared in Kannada films. He is best known for his supporting roles in such movies including Guri (1986), Samyuktha (1988) and Sri Manjunatha (2001).

Personal life 
Native to Brahmavar in Udupi, Sadashiva was born and raised in Bailhongal, Belagavi. He had a son and daughter. Sadashiva made news in 2017 when he found roaming alone in Kumta city and many local people offered him help.  He reunited with his children later.

Career 
Sadashiva started his career as an actor in theatre. He was noticed by filmmaker Siddalingaiah who offered Sadashiv a role in his film Hemavathi in 1977. He went on to appear in supporting roles of teacher, father, priest and watchman. In few movies like Samyuktha, Garuda Dhwaja and Nigooda Rahasya he played villain roles also. Starting from Hemavathi in 1977 till his last movie Bangara s/o Bangarada Manushya in 2017, Brahmavar has acted nearly 150 movies in Kannada.

Death 
Brahmavar died on 19 September 2018 due to age related ailments, including  dementia. He was 90. As per the actor's wish, his death news was announced a day after his cremation, held at Banashankari crematorium, to avoid media glare.

Selected filmography 
 Hemavathi (1977)
 Ranganayaki (1981)
 Kamanabillu
 Samayada Gombe
 Eradu Rekhegalu (1984)
 Dhruva Thare (1985)
 Bettada Hoovu (1985)
 Anuraga Aralithu 
 Kaliyuga Bheema
 Gruha Pravesha 
 Mane Devru
 Kanasembo Kudureyaneri (2010)
 Bangara S/o Bangarada Manushya
My memories short film (2013)

References

External links 
 

Male actors in Kannada cinema
21st-century Indian male actors
Male actors in Kannada theatre
People from Udupi district
People from Karnataka
2018 deaths
1928 births